Lotfi Saïdi (born 8 June 1982 in Tunisia) is a Tunisian soccer player who currently plays for SC Ben Arous, where he plays as a goalkeeper.

External links 

1982 births
Living people
Tunisian footballers
Tunisian expatriate footballers
Tunisian Ligue Professionnelle 1 players
Maltese Premier League players
CS Sfaxien players
AS Kasserine players
Floriana F.C. players
ES Beni-Khalled players
Jendouba Sport players
AS Djerba players
AS Soliman players
SC Ben Arous players
CS Korba players
Association football goalkeepers
Expatriate footballers in Malta